Naetochukwu Chikwe, stage name Naeto C, is a Nigerian rapper, Afrobeat artist and record producer.

Early life 
He was born in Houston, Texas and is of Nigerian origin.
The Governor of Imo State, Emeka Ihedioha appointed Naeto C, as his Special Assistant on Lagos Liaison.

Education
After finishing his secondary education in Lagos, he moved to the United States for higher education both in SUNY Old Westbury and a year later, George Washington University. It was at this time that he met Uzikwendu and Ikechukwu, who was then an aspiring hip-hop artist out of Washington Heights, New York. The trio went on to form the World Famous Academy, a brotherhood of musicians. They planned to grow into an independent record label but could not get their hands on the proper funds. Naeto C graduated in 2004 from the George Washington University with a BSc. in Biology, intending to go study further and become a medical doctor. After some deep self-searching he changed his mind and decided to pursue his dream and develop his talent as a musician.

In 2010 Naeto pursued an MSc in Energy Studies at the University of Dundee in Scotland.

It was reported in the Summer of 2013 by his mother that he was attending the University of Oxford in England studying "a course in Energy Economics" however there was no further elaboration on this course.

On November 17, 2020, Naeto C graduated with a Master's of Science in Energy Economics from the University Of Dundee, Scotland.

Career
Storm Records, (a record company based in Lagos, Nigeria) had been trying to sign the World Famous Akademy for some time, and since Naeto had decided to pursue his career as a musician he agreed along with the rest of the WFA. But they did not return to Nigeria until early 2006, when Ikechukwu released his debut album, Son Of the Soil. That album laid the grounds for Naeto C and the WFA. Working as an in-house producer with his newly discovered production team "ET-Quake" (consisting of TY Mix and VC Perez), Naeto was able to display his production skills working with Storm artists like Sasha, Dare Art-Alade, GT the Guitarman, Disconnect, Saro-Wiwa and Nkiru. Within a year of working with the aforementioned artists, Naeto had successfully recorded over 60 songs including his sophomore album material (a bulk of which he co-produced with ET-Quake).

A notable production achievement is the "I Believe" song Naeto wrote and co-produced with VC Perez (member of ET-Quake), which features himself, an up-and-coming R&B/Gospel artist, Sheun and Hugh Masekela from South Africa. Within the same year Naeto garnered a lot of experience performing, from Ikechukwu's album launch to Channel O awards to the I Believe Tour to Always promo tour with Sasha and many more gigs, in preparation for the phenomenal MTN Homecoming Concert, headlined by a popular friend, Nigerian pop sensation, D’banj. 
"Naeto C" recorded over 50 songs for his debut with production that transcended the hip hop sound of that time. From the Fela inspired "Lagos City Hustla" the most articulate reflection of Hip-Hop/Afro-beat till date to the down-south-melody-stricken first single "Sitting on Top", Naeto C has broken all boundaries and surpassed more limits than any up and coming artist, lyrically and production wise according to MO HIT RECORD.
His debut album You Know My "P" was released in May 2008. As of 2018, Naeto C's net worth was estimated to be $7.5 million and he was ranked among the richest and most influential artists in Nigeria.

Personal life 
Naeto C is married to Nicole Chikwe and they have three children. His wife described him as a 'perfect husband' despite his celebrity lifestyle and that has sustained the family and marriage. She said in an interview with News Agency of Nigeria (NAN) in 2019,

Discography
2008: U Know My "P"
2011: Super C Season
2015: Day 1
2015: Festival

Awards and nominations

Won
MTV Africa Music Awards 2008 – Best New Musician
2009 Channel O Music Video Awards – Video of the Year
MTV Africa Music Awards 2009 – Best New Artist

Nominated
2012 The Headies – Artiste of the Year
 2012 The Headies – Album of the Year (Super C Season)

References

External links
 Official Website
 Naeto C Supporters MySpace
 Storm 360 – The Entertainment Company

21st-century Nigerian male singers
Igbo rappers
Nigerian hip hop singers
Alumni of the University of Dundee
Living people
Year of birth missing (living people)